Dearie is a 1927 silent drama film produced and distributed by Warner Bros. and directed by Archie Mayo. It is from a story by Victorian author Carolyn Wells about a woman who sacrifices for her ungrateful son. This film starred Irene Rich and is considered a lost film. It is unknown, but the film might have been released with a Vitaphone soundtrack.

Plot
The film is told in flashback, as the repentant Stephen unfolds his life story to wealthy publisher Samuel Manley.

Finding herself in dire circumstances, the widowed Sylvia Darling determines that her son, Stephen, will complete his college education and develop his supposed literary talents; thus, she accepts a contract as singer in a Broadway nightclub, billed as "Dearie," and becomes an immediate sensation. Samuel Manley, a wealthy publisher who is attracted to Sylvia, allows her to entertain in his home, escorted by Luigi, the club proprietor. At college, Stephen and his self-styled roommates, Paul and Max, are expelled. He romances Edna, the publisher's niece, who promises to promote his book with her uncle. Unimpressed by the egotistical youth, Manley rejects his work. Enraged, Stephen accidentally wounds his mother. When he learns that she is a cabaret entertainer, the ungrateful boy grows to despise his mother, doing everything he can to humiliate her. Only when tragedy looms over the horizon does Stephen comes to his senses, and he begs his mother for forgiveness and is forgiven. Sylvia eventually marries Luigi.

Cast
Irene Rich as Sylvia Darling / Dearie
William Collier, Jr. as Stephen, her son
Edna Murphy as Ethel Jordan
Anders Randolf as Samuel Manley
Richard Tucker as Luigi
Arthur Rankin as Paul
David Mir as Max
Douglas Gerrard as Manley's friend
Violet Palmer as Sylvia's maid

See also
List of early Warner Bros. sound and talking features

References

External links

Image of lobby poster

1927 films
American silent feature films
Films directed by Archie Mayo
Lost American films
Silent American drama films
Warner Bros. films
American black-and-white films
1927 drama films
1927 lost films
Lost drama films
1920s American films